The 2009–10 Belarusian Extraliga season was the 18th season of the Belarusian Extraliga, the top level of ice hockey in Belarus. 14 teams participated in the league, and Yunost Minsk won the championship.

Regular season

Playoffs
Quarterfinals
Yunost Minsk - HK Vitebsk 3–0 on series
HK Sokil Kiev - HK Khimvolokno Mogilev 3–2 on series
HK Shakhtor Soligorsk - HK Neman Grodno 3–0 on series
HK Gomel - HK Keramin Minsk 3–0 on series
Semifinals
Yunost Minsk - HK Sokil Kiev 3–0 on series
HK Shakhtor Soligorsk - HK Gomel 3–1 on series
Final
Yunost Minsk - HK Shakhtor Soligorsk 4–3 on series

External links 
 Season on hockeyarchives.info

Belarusian Extraleague
Belarusian Extraleague seasons
Extra